Huber is an unincorporated community in Fayette County, Indiana, United States. The community is served by Indiana State Road 1 and is near Mettel Field.

References

Unincorporated communities in Fayette County, Indiana
Unincorporated communities in Indiana